Thomas ("Tommy") Litster Yule (born 15 March 1976) is a male former weightlifter.

Weightlifting career
Born in South Africa, he represented Great Britain at the 2000 Summer Olympics in Sydney, Australia.

He represented England and won three silver medals in the 105 kg category, at the 1998 Commonwealth Games in Kuala Lumpur, Malaysia. The three medals were won during an unusual period when three medals were awarded in one category (clean and jerk, snatch and combined) which invariably led to the same athlete winning all three of the same colour medal.

Yule then twice claimed a bronze medal for Scotland at the Commonwealth Games in 2002 and 2006.

Education
Yule was educated at Park House School and then St Batholomew's School in Newbury before attending Brasenose College, University of Oxford where in 1998 he received an MEng degree in Engineering Science.

Major results

* By 2002, medals were awarded in all three categories.

References

1976 births
Living people
Scottish male weightlifters
English male weightlifters
Olympic weightlifters of Great Britain
Weightlifters at the 2000 Summer Olympics
Sportspeople from Johannesburg
Commonwealth Games silver medallists for England
Commonwealth Games bronze medallists for Scotland
Weightlifters at the 1998 Commonwealth Games
Weightlifters at the 2002 Commonwealth Games
Weightlifters at the 2006 Commonwealth Games
Commonwealth Games medallists in weightlifting
Medallists at the 2002 Commonwealth Games
Medallists at the 2006 Commonwealth Games